Robert Haney (June 8, 1809 – January 7, 1885) was an American politician and businessman.

Haney was born in Batavia, New York to a Dutch family, and attended the city's Boys' Academy. He worked as a hardware merchant from 1839 to 1850. In 1848, Haney went into partnership with John De Bow to open a store in Milwaukee, Wisconsin.  Haney remained in Batavia until a disastrous fire in February 1850 persuaded him to move permanently to Milwaukee with his family.

Haney operated a retail and wholesale hardware store in Milwaukee until the end of his life. He began in 1848 on the corner of present-day Wisconsin Avenue and Water Street, and moved in 1849 to present-day Plankinton Avenue. A fire again destroyed Haney's store on August 24, 1854, but he rebuilt and business recovered. In 1866, the Milwaukee Sentinel ranked him as one of the forty-eight most prosperous men in Milwaukee.

A contemporary book written on the history of Milwaukee describes Haney in the following manner:

Haney was elected to the Wisconsin State Assembly for the 1861 term as a Democrat.

References 

Hardware merchants
People from Batavia, New York
Politicians from Milwaukee
Businesspeople from Milwaukee
Democratic Party members of the Wisconsin State Assembly
1809 births
1885 deaths
19th-century American politicians
19th-century American businesspeople